Elachista controversa is a moth of the family Elachistidae that is found in California.

The basal 1/4 of the costa of the forewings is chocolate-brown. The ground colour is snow-white, often with creamy tinge and often weakly dusted with brownish grey tips of scales. The hindwings are grey. The underside of the wings is grey.

References

controversa
Moths described in 1923
Endemic fauna of California
Moths of North America
Fauna without expected TNC conservation status